MOS 0261 is the United States Marine Corps (USMC) Military Occupational Specialty (MOS) code for Geographic Intelligence Specialist. It is an entry level MOS.

General information
MOS 0261, Geographic intelligence specialist is an entry level primary MOS. Geographic intelligence specialists collect, analyze, process, and disseminate geophysical data. They perform precision ground control survey operations to provide the positional data required for various weapons delivery and C3 systems, construct and revise military maps and charts, conduct geodetic, topographic, and hydrographic survey operations, and analyze terrain and hydrography as a functional aspect of military intelligence. Equipment utilized includes survey and mapping instrumentation such as the theodolites, electronic and satellite positioning equipment, and microcomputer based mapping equipment.

Training
Training for this MOS is conducted at the National Geospatial-Intelligence College at the National Geospatial-Intelligence Agency (NGA) Campus East in Springfield, Virginia. The training period is approximately 7 months.

External links
0261, Geographic Intelligence Specialist - "usmilitary.about.com"

United States Marine Corps personnel